Cumberland Avenue (also known as Cumberland Street) was a station on the demolished BMT Fulton Street Line. The Fulton Street Elevated was built by the Kings County Elevated Railway Company and this station started service on April 24, 1888. The station had 2 tracks and 2 offset side platforms. It was served by trains of the BMT Fulton Street Line, and until 1920, trains of the BMT Brighton Line. This station was served by steam locomotives between 1888 and 1899. In 1898, the Brooklyn Rapid Transit Company (BRT) absorbed the Kings County Elevated Railway, and it took over the Fulton Street El, and it was electrified on July 3, 1899. It also had a connection to the Greene and Gates Avenues Line trolleys. In 1936, the Independent Subway System built the Fulton Street subway and added a station nearby named Lafayette Avenue despite the fact that it was two blocks southeast of its namesake. The el station became obsolete, and it closed on June 1, 1940, when all service from Fulton Ferry and Park Row to Rockaway Avenue was abandoned, as it came under city ownership.

References

Defunct BMT Fulton Street Line stations
Railway stations in the United States opened in 1888
Railway stations closed in 1940